Electric energy consumption is the form of energy consumption that uses electrical energy. Electric energy consumption is the actual energy demand made on existing electricity supply for transportation, residential, industrial, commercial, and other miscellaneous purposes. 

Global electricity consumption in 2019 was 22,848 terawatt-hour (TWh), about 135% more than the amount of consumption in 1990 (9,702 TWh). China, United States, and India accounted for over 50% of the global share of electricity consumption.

Overview 
Electric energy is most often measured either in joules (J), or in watt hours (W·h).

 1 W·s = 1 J
 1 W·h = 3600 W·s = 3600 J

Electric and electronic devices consume electric energy to generate desired output (i.e., light, heat, motion, etc.). During operation, some part of the energy is lost depending on the electrical efficiency.

Electricity has been generated in power stations since 1882. The invention of the steam turbine in 1884 to drive the electric generator led to an increase in worldwide electricity consumption.

In 2019, total worldwide electricity production was nearly 27,044 TWh. Total primary energy is converted into numerous forms, including, but not limited to, electricity, heat, and natural gas. Some primary energy is lost during the conversion to electricity, as seen in the United States, where 61% was lost in 2019. 

Electricity accounted for 19.7% of worldwide final energy consumption in 2019, while oil was 40.4%, coal was 9.5%, natural gas was 16.4%, biofuels and waste were 10.4%, and other sources (i.e., heat, solar thermal, and geothermal) were 3.6%. Total final electricity consumption in 2019 was split unevenly between the following sectors: industry (41.9%), residential (26.6%), commercial and public services (21.2%), transport (1.8%), and other (8.5%; i.e., agriculture and fishing). Since 1973, final electricity consumption has decreased in the industrial and transport sectors and increased in the residential, commercial and public services sectors.

A sensitivity analysis on an adaptive neuro-fuzzy network model for electric demand estimation shows that employment is the most critical factor influencing electrical consumption. The study used six parameters as input data, employment, GDP, dwelling, population, heating degree day and cooling degree day, with electricity demand as output variable.

World electricity consumption (2019) 
The table lists 37 electricity consuming countries, which used 20,366 TWh. These countries comprised 89% of the final consumption of 190+ countries. Final consumption to generate this electricity is provided per country. The data is from 2019.

Consumption per capita 

Final consumption divided by number of inhabitants provides a country's consumption per capita. In Western Europe, this is between 4 and 8 MWh/a. (1 MWh equals 1000 kWh.) In Scandinavia, USA, Canada, Taiwan and South Korea, per capita consumption is higher, however, in developing countries it is much lower. The world's average is nearly 3 MWh/a. A very low consumption level, as in Indonesia, indicates that many inhabitants are not connected to the electricity grid, and that is the reason that some of the world's most populous countries, such as Nigeria and Bangladesh, do not appear in the table.

Electricity generation and GDP (2019) 
The table lists 30 countries, which represent about 76% of the world population, 84% of the world GDP, and  85% of the world electricity generation. Productivity per electricity generation (concept similar to energy intensity) can be measured by dividing GDP over the electricity generated. The data is from 2019.

Electricity consumption by sector (2019) 
The table lists the 10 countries with the highest final electricity consumption. These 10 countries comprised 69% of the final consumption in the world. The data is from 2019.

Electricity consumption of OECD countries (2019) 
In 2019, OECD's final electricity consumption was 9,672 TWh. The industrial sector consumed 41.9% of the electricity, the residential sector consumed 26.6%, the commercial and public services sectors consumed 21.2%, the transport sector consumed 1.8%, and the other sectors (e.g., agriculture and fishing) consumed 8.5%. In recent decades, consumption in the residential and commercial and public services sectors have grown, while industry consumption has declined. More recently, the transport sector has witnessed an increase in consumption with the growth in the electric vehicle market.

World electricity consumption and production (2017 and 2018) 
The IEA reported a total world final electricity consumption in 2017 of 21,539 TWh and 22,472 TWh in 2018. The final electricity consumption of the OECD countries in 2017 was 9,612 TWh and 9,780 TWh in 2018. This compares to electricity production in the OECD countries of 11,148 TWh in 2017 and 11,348 TWh in 2018. The final electricity consumption of the non-OECD countries in 2017 was 11,927 TWh and 12,692 TWh in 2018. The share of the gross electric production by source is summarized in the following table for the available assessment in the years 2017 or 2018.

Electricity outlook 

Looking forward, increasing energy efficiency will result in less electricity needed for a given demand in power, but demand will increase strongly on the account of:
 Economic growth in developing countries, and
 Electrification of transport and heating. Combustion engines are replaced by electric drive and for heating less gas and oil, but more electricity is used, if possible with heat pumps.

As transport and heating become more climate-friendly, the environmental effect of energy consumption will be more determined by electricity.

The International Energy Agency expects revisions of subsidies for fossil fuels which amounted to $550 billion in 2013, more than four times renewable energy subsidies. In this scenario, almost half of the increase in 2040 of electricity consumption is covered by more than 80% growth of renewable energy. Many new nuclear plants will be constructed, mainly to replace old ones. The nuclear part of electricity generation will increase from 11 to 12%. The renewable part goes up much more, from 21 to 33%. The IEA warns that in order to restrict global warming to 2 °C, carbon dioxide emissions must not exceed 1000 gigaton (Gt) from 2014. This limit is reached in 2040 and emissions will not drop to zero ever.

The World Energy Council sees world electricity consumption increasing to more than 40,000 TWh/a in 2040. The fossil part of generation depends on energy policy. It can stay around 70% in the so-called Jazz scenario where countries rather independently "improvise" but it can also decrease to around 40% in the Symphony scenario if countries work "orchestrated" for more climate friendly policy. Carbon dioxide emissions, 32 Gt/a in 2012, will increase to 46 Gt/a in Jazz but decrease to 26 Gt/a in Symphony. Accordingly, until 2040 the renewable part of generation will stay at about 20% in Jazz but increase to about 45% in Symphony.

An EU survey conducted on climate and energy consumption in 2022 found that 63% of people in the European Union want energy costs to be dependent on use, with the greatest consumers paying more. This is compared to 83% in China, 63% in the UK and 57% in the US. 24% of Americans surveyed believing that people and businesses should do more to cut their own usage (compared to 20% in the UK, 19% in the EU, and 17% in China).

Nearly half of those polled in the European Union (47%) and the United Kingdom (45%) want their government to focus on the development of renewable energies. This is compared to 37% in both the United States and China when asked to list their priorities on energy.

See also 

 Electricity generation
 Electricity retailing
 Energy intensity by country
 List of countries by carbon dioxide emissions
 List of countries by electricity consumption
 List of countries by electricity production
 List of countries by energy consumption per capita
 List of countries by greenhouse gas emissions
 List of countries by renewable electricity production
 List of countries by total primary energy consumption and production
 World energy supply and consumption

References

External links 
World Electricity production 2012
World Map and Chart of Energy Consumption by country by Lebanese-economy-forum, World Bank data
Electricity Information 2019 - IEA

Electric power
Consumption
 
Energy consumption
Energy development
Energy policy